Legislative elections were held in New Caledonia on 15 April 1962. The result was a victory for the Caledonian Union, which retained its majority in the Assembly.

Background
The Assembly elected in 1958 was dissolved by the Governor Laurent Elisée Péchoux on 9 March after the Caledonian Union (which held a majority of seats) refused to approve the High Commissioner's agenda.

Results
The Caledonian Union retained the 18 seats it won in the 1958 elections. The Entente, an alliance of the Union for the New Republic and some Caledonian Union dissidents won nine seats, whilst the Caledonian Rally was reduced to only three seats.

Elected members

Aftermath
The newly elected Assembly met for the first time on 26 April. Antoine Griscelli was elected as president of the legislature.

On 6 June 1962, the results in the South constituency were annulled. A by-election was held on 4 November, in which the Caledonian Union won five seats (Luc Chevalier, Evenor de Greslan, Antoine Griscelli, Armand Ohlen and Rock Pidjot), Caledonian Rally three (Berge, Henri Lafleur and Claude Parazols) and the Entente two (Georges Chatenay and Thomas Hagen). This represented a loss of one seat for the Caledonian Union (Kamandji Ouamambare) and gain of one seat for the Caledonian Rally (Berge and Parazols, replacing Albert Rapadzi).

Gaston Belouma resigned from the Assembly on 26 October and was replaced by Thène Fonguimoin Boahoumé-Arhou, who was next on the party's list. Théophile Wakolo Pouyé resigned on 4 December the same year and was replaced by Austien Dalap Touyada. Maurice Lenormand resigned on 21 March 1964 and was replaced by Henri Teambouéon.

Antoine Griscelli died on 22 November 1966 and Paul Katrei on 10 April 1967. Neither were replaced.

References

Elections in New Caledonia
New Caledonia
1962 in New Caledonia
April 1962 events in Oceania
Election and referendum articles with incomplete results